This is a list of bridges and ferries that cross the Richelieu River from the Saint Lawrence River upstream to Lake Champlain.

Crossings

See also

 Richelieu River
 List of crossings of the Saint Lawrence River and the Great Lakes

References

Richelieu River
Richelieu River